= Surkhab TV =

- Type: Digital News Channel
- Format: online
- Owner: Surkhab Media Opc. Pvt. Ltd
- Founded: 2018
- Language: Punjabi
- Website: http://surkhabtv.com/

Surkhab TV is a Punjabi language news channel, owned by the Surkhab Media Opc Pvt. Ltd.

== History ==
The channel launched in 2018. The channel deliver news in Punjabi language on all online digital Platform.
